Sahib Khazal (born 1 January 1943) is a former Iraqi football defender who played for Iraq in the 1972 AFC Asian Cup. He played for Iraq between 1963 and 1975.

He was part of the team that played their first World Cup qualifiers in 1974.

References

Iraqi footballers
Iraq international footballers
1972 AFC Asian Cup players
Association football defenders
1943 births
Living people
Al-Quwa Al-Jawiya managers
Iraqi football managers